Myaksa is a rural locality (a selo) and the administrative center of Myaksinskoye Rural Settlement, Cherepovetsky District, Vologda Oblast, Russia. The population was 1,143 as of 2002. There are 21 streets.

Geography 
Voshchazhnikovo is the nearest rural locality.

References 

Rural localities in Cherepovetsky District